{{DISPLAYTITLE:C15H16O5}}
The molecular formula C15H16O5 (molar mass: 276.28 g/mol, exact mass: 276.099774 u) may refer to:

 Dihydromethysticin, a kavalactone found in the kava plant
 Lactucin, a bitter sesquiterpene lactone found in lettuce
 Vernolepin, a sesquiterpene lactone found in Vernonia amygdalina

Molecular formulas